Shadows of a Hot Summer is a 1978 Czechoslovak thriller film by František Vláčil. The film won a Crystal Globe award at the Karlovy Vary International Film Festival in 1978.

Cast
 Juraj Kukura as Ondřej Baran
 Marta Vančurová as Tereza Baranová
 Gustáv Valach as Pavel Valchar
 Robert Lischke as Lukáš Baran
 Karel Chromík as Ukrainian Lieutenant
 Zdeněk Kutil as "Old"
 Jiří Bartoška as "White-haired"
 Augustín Kubán as "Bald"
 Gustav Opočenský as injured Ukrainian
 Ilja Prachař as Lieutenant Grygar
 Michal Ladižinský as Drunk

Plot
The film is set in the 1940s after the end of World War II. Ondřej Baran lives with his family in Beskydy, at a homestead in the mountains. One day five members of the Ukrainian Insurgent Army come to their house. One of them is injured and the Ukrainians want to hide in the house until he recovers. They take the family as hostages and force Ondřej to bring a doctor to the house. They threaten Ondřej that if he appeals for help they will kill his family. Ondřej eventually realises that he has to deal with them by himself. He kills all the Ukrainians, but one of them shoots him and he dies. The film ends with Ondřej's funeral.

Reception

Accolades

References

External links
 

1978 films
1970s thriller films
1970s Czech-language films
Czech thriller films
Czechoslovak thriller films
Films directed by František Vláčil
Ukrainian Insurgent Army
1970s Czech films
Films about Ukrainian anti-Soviet resistance movement